James Wallace McCarter (1872–1939), ran for Governor of South Dakota in 1914.

Biography
He was born in Jarvis, Ontario on July 29, 1872. He was the county judge in South Dakota from 1910 to 1913. He ran for Governor of South Dakota in 1914, losing to Frank M. Byrne. He was also a candidate for U.S. Representative from the 2nd District of South Dakota in 1918. He died in 1939.

References

1872 births
1939 deaths
American Presbyterians
South Dakota Democrats
South Dakota state court judges